is a mountain in the Hidaka Mountains of Hokkaidō, Japan. The mountain sits on the border between Minamifurano and Shimukappu. It is the source of the Mu River (Hokkaidō).

Mount Karifuri is split between two different rock types. The western side consists of plutonic rock formed 40–32 million years ago. The eastern side is made of metamorphic rock formed under low-to-mid pressure 50–20 million years ago.

References 

Karifuri